Pallacanestro Reggiana are a basketball team based in Reggio Emilia, Italy. The Italian side played various seasons in Europe, winning 2013-14 FIBA EuroChallenge in Bologna against Triumph Lyubertsy.

1998-99 Korać Cup

First round 
  Fraport Skyliners -  Bipop Carire Reggio Emilia 71-68 
Arena: Ballsporthalle, Frankfurt , 7 October 1998

  Bipop Carire Reggio Emilia -  Telindus Oostende 71-90 
Arena: PalaBigi, Reggio Emilia , 14 October 1998

  Unicaja Málaga -  Bipop Carire Reggio Emilia 59-65 
Arena: Palacio de Deportes José María Martín Carpena, Málaga , 21 October 1998

  Bipop Carire Reggio Emilia -  Fraport Skyliners 92-84
Arena: PalaBigi, Reggio Emilia , 4 November 1998

  Telindus Oostende -  Bipop Carire Reggio Emilia 99-55
Arena: Flanders Expo, Ghent , 10 November 1998

  Bipop Carire Reggio Emilia -  Unicaja Málaga 85-72 
Arena: PalaBigi, Reggio Emilia , 18 November 1998

Second round
  Bipop Carire Reggio Emilia -  Panionios B.C. 79-69
Arena: PalaBigi, Reggio Emilia , 9 December 1998

  Panionios B.C. -  Bipop Carire Reggio Emilia 81-58 (150-137 on aggregate)
Arena: Nea Smyrni Indoor Hall, Athens , 16 December 1998

1999-2000 Korać Cup

First round
  Maccabi Haifa B.C. -  Bipop Carire Reggio Emilia 85-60 
Arena: Romema Arena, Haifa , 13 October 1999

  Bipop Carire Reggio Emilia -  Nikol Fert 96-71 
Arena: PalaBigi, Reggio Emilia , 20 October 1999

  Bipop Carire Reggio Emilia -  Maccabi Haifa B.C. 70-69 
Arena: PalaBigi, Reggio Emilia , 10 November 1999

  Nikol Fert -  Bipop Carire Reggio Emilia 75-71 
Arena: Sports Hall Mladost, Gostivar , 17 November 1999

Second round 
  Bipop Carire Reggio Emilia -  Unicaja Málaga 67-74 
Arena: PalaBigi, Reggio Emilia , 8 December 1999

  Unicaja Málaga -  Bipop Carire Reggio Emilia 61-55 (135-122 on aggregate)
Arena: Palacio de Deportes José María Martín Carpena, Málaga , 15 December 1999

2002-03 FIBA Champions Cup

First round
  Bipop Carire Reggio Emilia -  EiffelTowers Nijmegen 81-76
Arena: PalaBigi, Reggio Emilia , 2 October 2002

  SLUC Nancy -  Bipop Carire Reggio Emilia 75-72 
Arena: Palais des Sports Jean Weille, Nancy , 8 October 2002

  Porto Ferpinta -  Bipop Carire Reggio Emilia 111-82 
Arena: Pavilhão de Matosinhos, Matosinhos , 15 October 2002

  Bipop Carire Reggio Emilia -  Quatro Basket Bree 87-66 
Arena: PalaBigi, Reggio Emilia , 22 October 2002

  CAB Madeira -  Bipop Carire Reggio Emilia 106-108 
Arena: Pavilhão de Funchal, Funchal , 29 October 2002

  EiffelTowers Nijmegen -  Bipop Carire Reggio Emilia 97-92 
Arena: Sportal De Horstacker, Nijmegen , 5 November 2002

  Bipop Carire Reggio Emilia -  SLUC Nancy 78-72 
Arena: PalaBigi, Reggio Emilia , 12 November 2002

  Bipop Carire Reggio Emilia -  Porto Ferpinta 91-79 
Arena: PalaBigi, Reggio Emilia , 3 December 2002

  Quatro Basket Bree -  Bipop Carire Reggio Emilia 90-96 
Arena: Expodroom, Bree , 10 December 2002

  Bipop Carire Reggio Emilia -  CAB Madeira 71-66
Arena: PalaBigi, Reggio Emilia , 17 December 2002

Pan-European Phase 
  Unelco Tenerife -   Bipop Carire Reggio Emilia 79-67 
Arena: Pabellón Insular Santiago Martín, San Cristóbal de La Laguna , 4 February 2003

  Bipop Carire Reggio Emilia -  Lukoil Academic 71-94
Arena: PalaBigi, Reggio Emilia , 11 February 2003

  Bipop Carire Reggio Emilia -  Bnei HaSharon 97-90
Arena: PalaBigi, Reggio Emilia , 25 February 2003

  Bipop Carire Reggio Emilia -  Unelco Tenerife 67-88
Arena: PalaBigi, Reggio Emilia , 4 March 2003

  Lukoil Academic -  Bipop Carire Reggio Emilia 94-64 
Arena: Universiada Hall, Sofia , 18 March 2003

  Bnei HaSharon -  Bipop Carire Reggio Emilia 0-20 - The game was abandoned due to the ongoing Second Intifada, Reggio didn't travel to Israel.

2005-06 ULEB Cup

Regular season
  Landi Renzo Reggio Emilia -  Panionios Forthnet 67-60
Arena: PalaBigi, Reggio Emilia , 8 November 2005

  Hemofarm Vršac -  Landi Renzo Reggio Emilia 78-69 
Arena: Millennium Centar, Vršac , 15 November 2005

  Landi Renzo Reggio Emilia -  Adecco ASVEL 82-66 
Arena: PalaBigi, Reggio Emilia , 22 November 2005

  Anwil Włocławek -  Landi Renzo Reggio Emilia 79-85 
Arena: Hala Mistrzów, Włocławek , 29 November 2005

  Landi Renzo Reggio Emilia -  Demon Astronauts 93-59
Arena: PalaBigi, Reggio Emilia , 6 December 2005

  Panionios Forthnet -  Landi Renzo Reggio Emilia 79-75
Arena: Nea Smyrni Hall, Athens , 13 December 2005

  Landi Renzo Reggio Emilia -  Hemofarm Vršac 83-62 
Arena: PalaBigi, Reggio Emilia , 20 December 2005

  Adecco ASVEL -  Landi Renzo Reggio Emilia 81-73
Arena: Astroballe, Villeurbanne , 3 January 2006

  Landi Renzo Reggio Emilia -  Anwil Włocławek 83-78
Arena: PalaBigi, Reggio Emilia , 10 January 2006

  Demon Astronauts -  Landi Renzo Reggio Emilia 62-81
Arena: Sporthallen Zuid, Amsterdam , 17 January 2006

Round of 16
  BK Ventspils -  Landi Renzo Reggio Emilia 87-86
Arena: Ventspils Olympic Center Basketball Hall, Ventspils , 31 January 2006

  Landi Renzo Reggio Emilia -  BK Ventspils 86-83 (172-170 on aggregate)
Arena: PalaBigi, Reggio Emilia , 7 February 2006

Quarter-finals
  Hemofarm Vršac -  Landi Renzo Reggio Emilia 88-72
Arena: Millennium Centar, Vršac , 28 February 2006

  Landi Renzo Reggio Emilia -  Hemofarm Vršac 75-77 (147-165 on aggregate)
Arena: PalaBigi, Reggio Emilia , 7 March 2006

2013-14 FIBA EuroChallenge

Regular season
  Grissin Bon Reggio Emilia -  Okapi Aalstar 80-63
Arena: PalaBigi, Reggio Emilia , 5 November 2013

  KTP-Basket -  Grissin Bon Reggio Emilia 75-71
Arena: Straveco-Arena, Kotka , 12 November 2013

  Grissin Bon Reggio Emilia -  GasTerra Flames 78-61
Arena: PalaBigi, Reggio Emilia , 19 November 2013

  Okapi Aalstar -  Grissin Bon Reggio Emilia 71-78 
Arena: Okapi Forum, Aalst , 3 December 2013

  Grissin Bon Reggio Emilia -  KTP-Basket 86-75
Arena: PalaBigi, Reggio Emilia , 10 December 2013

  GasTerra Flames -  Grissin Bon Reggio Emilia 85-60
Arena: MartiniPlaza, Groningen , 17 December 2013

Last 16
  Grissin Bon Reggio Emilia -  Szolnoki Olaj KK 90-68
Arena: PalaBigi, Reggio Emilia , 14 January 2014

  Cholet Basket -  Grissin Bon Reggio Emilia 81-78 
Arena: La Meilleraie, Cholet , 21 January 2014

  Grissin Bon Reggio Emilia -  Krka Novo Mesto 82-71
Arena: PalaBigi, Reggio Emilia , 28 January 2014

  Szolnoki Olaj KK -  Grissin Bon Reggio Emilia 90-78 
Arena: Tiszaligeti Sportcsarnok, Szolnok , 11 February 2014

  Grissin Bon Reggio Emilia -  Cholet Basket 82-65 
Arena: PalaBigi, Reggio Emilia , 18 February 2014

  Krka Novo Mesto -  Grissin Bon Reggio Emilia 66-69
Arena: Leon Štukelj Hall, Novo Mesto , 25 February 2014

Quarter-finals
 Game 1:  Grissin Bon Reggio Emilia -  BC Krasnye Krylia 75-63
Arena: PalaBigi, Reggio Emilia , 11 March 2014

 Game 2:  BC Krasnye Krylia -  Grissin Bon Reggio Emilia 71-73 (Reggio wins the series 2-0 and advance to the Final Four) 
Arena: MTL Arena, Samara , 13 March 2014

Final four 
 Semifinal:  Grissin Bon Reggio Emilia -  Royal Halı Gaziantep 66-55
Arena: PalaDozza, Bologna , 25 April 2014

 Final:  Tryumph Lyubertsy -  Grissin Bon Reggio Emilia 65-79 (Reggio wins the EuroChallenge)
Arena: PalaDozza, Bologna , 27 April 2014

2014-15 EuroCup
  Grissin Bon Reggio Emilia -  Brose Baskets 70-67
Arena: PalaDozza, Bologna , 15 October 2014

  Paris-Levallois Basket -  Grissin Bon Reggio Emilia 88-76
Arena: Palais des sports Marcel-Cerdan, Paris , 21 October 2014

  Grissin Bon Reggio Emilia -  SIG Strasbourg 59-66
Arena: PalaDozza, Bologna , 28 October 2014

  CAI Zaragoza -  Grissin Bon Reggio Emilia 93-79
Arena: Pabellón Príncipe Felipe, Zaragoza , 4 November 2014

  Grissin Bon Reggio Emilia -  Telekom Baskets Bonn 84-85 
Arena: PalaDozza, Bologna , 12 November 2014

  Brose Baskets -  Grissin Bon Reggio Emilia 75-61 
Arena: Brose Arena, Bamberg , 19 November 2014

  Grissin Bon Reggio Emilia -  Paris-Levallois Basket 78-72
Arena: PalaDozza, Bologna , 25 November 2014

  SIG Strasbourg -  Grissin Bon Reggio Emilia 74-66
Arena: Rhénus Sport, Strasbourg , 3 December 2014

  Grissin Bon Reggio Emilia -  CAI Zaragoza 75-87
Arena: PalaDozza, Bologna , 9 December 2014

  Telekom Baskets Bonn -  Grissin Bon Reggio Emilia 101-87 
Arena: Telekom Dome, Bonn , 17 December 2014

2015-16 EuroCup

Regular season
  Grissin Bon Reggio Emilia -  Enel Brindisi 82-79
Arena: PalaBigi, Reggio Emilia , 14 October 2015

  ALBA Berlin -  Grissin Bon Reggio Emilia 82-76 
Arena: Mercedes-Benz Arena, Berlin , 20 October 2015

  MHP Riesen Ludwigsburg -  Grissin Bon Reggio Emilia 65-76
Arena: MHPArena, Ludwigsburg , 28 October 2015

  Grissin Bon Reggio Emilia -  Le Mans Sarthe Basket 93-82
Arena: PalaBigi, Reggio Emilia , 3 November 2015

  Herbalife Gran Canaria -  Grissin Bon Reggio Emilia 76-67
Arena: Gran Canaria Arena, Las Palmas , 10 November 2015

  Enel Brindisi -  Grissin Bon Reggio Emilia 87-81
Arena: PalaPentassuglia, Mesagne , 18 November 2015

  Grissin Bon Reggio Emilia -  ALBA Berlin 74-71
Arena: PalaBigi, Reggio Emilia , 25 November 2015

  Grissin Bon Reggio Emilia -  MHP Riesen Ludwigsburg 69-68
Arena: PalaBigi, Reggio Emilia , 2 December 2015

  Le Mans Sarthe Basket -  Grissin Bon Reggio Emilia 71-87
Arena: Antarès, Le Mans , 9 December 2015

  Grissin Bon Reggio Emilia -  Herbalife Gran Canaria 73-78
Arena: PalaBigi, Reggio Emilia , 16 December 2015

Last 32
  Dolomiti Energia Trento -  Grissin Bon Reggio Emilia 82-63
Arena: PalaTrento, Trento , 6 January 2016

  Grissin Bon Reggio Emilia -  Pınar Karşıyaka 88-81
Arena: PalaBigi, Reggio Emilia , 13 January 2016

  Trabzonspor Medical Park -  Grissin Bon Reggio Emilia 82-76
Arena: Hayri Gür Arena, Trabzon , 20 January 2016

  Grissin Bon Reggio Emilia -  Trabzonspor Medical Park 89-76
Arena: PalaBigi, Reggio Emilia , 27 January 2016

  Grissin Bon Reggio Emilia -  Dolomiti Energia Trento 72-84 
Arena: PalaBigi, Reggio Emilia , 3 February 2016

  Pınar Karşıyaka -  Grissin Bon Reggio Emilia 109-66
Arena: Mustafa Kemal Atatürk Karşıyaka Sports Hall, İzmir , 10 February 2016

2017-18 EuroCup

Regular season
  Budućnost VOLI Podgorica -  Grissin Bon Reggio Emilia 82-74
Arena: Morača Sports Center, Podgorica , 11 October 2017

  Grissin Bon Reggio Emilia -  Galatasaray Odeabank 74-71
Arena: PalaBigi, Reggio Emilia , 18 October 2017

  BC Lietkabelis -  Grissin Bon Reggio Emilia 75-82
Arena: Cido Arena, Panevėžys , 25 October 2017

  Grissin Bon Reggio Emilia -  Hapoel Bank Yahav Jerusalem 61-63
Arena: PalaBigi, Reggio Emilia , 1 November 2017

  Bayern Munich -  Grissin Bon Reggio Emilia 83-58 
Arena: Audi Dome, Munich , 8 November 2017

  Grissin Bon Reggio Emilia -  Budućnost VOLI Podgorica 77-71
Arena: PalaBigi, Reggio Emilia , 15 November 2017

  Galatasaray Odeabank -  Grissin Bon Reggio Emilia 82-72
Arena: Sinan Erdem Dome, İstanbul, 6 December 2017

  Grissin Bon Reggio Emilia -  BC Lietkabelis 82-85 OT
Arena: PalaBigi, Reggio Emilia , 13 December 2017

  Hapoel Bank Yahav Jerusalem -  Grissin Bon Reggio Emilia 66-79
Arena: Pais Arena Jerusalem, Jerusalem , 20 December 2017

  Grissin Bon Reggio Emilia -  Bayern Munich 90-82
Arena: PalaBigi, Reggio Emilia , 27 December 2017

Basketball teams in Italy

Top 16
  Grissin Bon Reggio Emilia -  CSP Limoges 87-54 
Arena: PalaBigi, Reggio Emilia , 2 January 2018

  ASVEL Villeurbanne -  Grissin Bon Reggio Emilia 68-64
Arena: Astroballe, Villeurbanne, 10 January 2018

  UNICS Kazan -  Grissin Bon Reggio Emilia 69-71
Arena: Basket-Hall Kazan, Kazan, 16 January 2018

  Grissin Bon Reggio Emilia -  UNICS Kazan 76-75
Arena: PalaBigi, Reggio Emilia , 23 January 2018

  CSP Limoges -  Grissin Bon Reggio Emilia 80-71
Arena: Palais des Sports de Beaublanc, Limoges, 30 January 2018 

  Grissin Bon Reggio Emilia -  ASVEL Villeurbanne 75-68
Arena: PalaBigi, Reggio Emilia , 6 February 2018

Quarter-finals
 Game 1:  Grissin Bon Reggio Emilia -  B.C. Zenit Saint Petersburg 75-61
Arena: PalaBigi, Reggio Emilia , 6 March 2018

 Game 2:  B.C. Zenit Saint Petersburg -  Grissin Bon Reggio Emilia 91-77
Arena: Yubileyny Sports Palace, Saint Petersburg , 9 March 2018

 Game 3:  Grissin Bon Reggio Emilia -  B.C. Zenit Saint Petersburg 105-99 (Reggio wins the series 2-1 and advances to the semifinals) 
Arena: PalaBigi, Reggio Emilia , 14 March 2018

Semifinals
 Game 1:  Lokomotiv Kuban -  Grissin Bon Reggio Emilia
Arena: Basket-Hall Krasnodar, Krasnodar , 20 March 2018 

 Game 2:  Grissin Bon Reggio Emilia -  Lokomotiv Kuban 
Arena: PalaBigi, Reggio Emilia , 23 March 2018